Don Palmer (born 3 October 1938) is  a former Australian rules footballer who played with North Melbourne in the Victorian Football League (VFL).

References

External links 
		

Living people
1938 births
Australian rules footballers from Victoria (Australia)
North Melbourne Football Club players